Rebhan (German: from Middle High German rephān "partridge" a metonymic occupational name for a hunter of partridges or a nickname for someone supposedly resembling a partridge in some way) is a surname. Notable people with the name include:

Eckhard Rebhan (born 1937), German physicist and professor
Mike Rebhan (born 1967), former college baseball player
Nikolaus Rebhan (1571–1626), German theologician
Paul Rebhan, author, musician and artist living in New York City
Robert Rebhan (born 1945), expert and speaker on financial crimes
Surnames from nicknames

Occupational surnames